Soslan Tamazovich Daurov (born 15 January 1991) is a Russian Greco-Roman wrestler who represents Belarus in the 59 kg and 67 kg category. He won a silver medal at the 2015 European Games, but was eliminated in the first bout at the 2016 Olympics.

Daurov was born in Vladikavkaz, Russia, where he took up wrestling in 2001. In 2011 he moved to Belarus with his family, and in 2012 received Belarusian citizenship. He studies physical education at the Hrodna State University.

In March 2021, he competed at the European Qualification Tournament in Budapest, Hungary hoping to qualify for the 2020 Summer Olympics in Tokyo, Japan.

References

External links 
 

1991 births
Living people
Olympic wrestlers of Belarus
Wrestlers at the 2016 Summer Olympics
Wrestlers at the 2015 European Games
Wrestlers at the 2019 European Games
European Games medalists in wrestling
European Games silver medalists for Belarus
European Games bronze medalists for Belarus